The 35th Vehbi Emre & Hamit Kaplan Tournament 2017, was a wrestling event held in Istanbul, Turkey between 4 and 5 March 2017.

This international tournament includes competition men's Greco-Roman wrestling. This ranking tournament was held in honor of the Olympic Champion, Hamit Kaplan and Turkish Wrestler and manager Vehbi Emre.

Medal overview

Medal table

Greco-Roman

Participating nations

References 

Vehbi Emre and Hamit Kaplan
Vehbi Emre and Hamit Kaplan
June 2017 sports events in Turkey
Sports competitions in Istanbul
International wrestling competitions hosted by Turkey
Vehbi Emre & Hamit Kaplan Tournament